Defence of India act may refer to
Defence of India Act 1915, an emergency criminal law enacted in British India in 1915 as measures against the threat of Indian revolutionary nationalism during World War I.
Defence of India Act, 1939, enacted in British India in September 1939 effectively declaring martial law at the onset of World War II.
Defence of India act and Defence of India rules, 1962, enacted in independent India during the Sino-Indian war of 1962.
Defence of India Act, 1971, enacted in independent India in December 1971 at the onset of the 1971 Indo-Pak war.